Anselmus may refer to:

 Various Anselms
 Anselmus de Boodt (1550–1632), Belgian mineralogist and physician
 A character in The Second Maiden's Tragedy

See also
 Ansel (disambiguation) and Ansell (disambiguation), the German form of the name
 Anselmo (disambiguation), the Italian form of the name
 St Anselm (disambiguation), various saints
 St Anselm's (disambiguation), various places